The 2013–14 Southern Utah Thunderbirds basketball team  represented Southern Utah University during the 2013–14 NCAA Division I men's basketball season. The Thunderbirds were led by second year head coach Nick Robinson and played their home games at the Centrum Arena. They were members of the Big Sky Conference.

The Thunderbirds entered the 2013–14 season with two new assistants. Chad Bell and Yahosh Bonner were hired and acted as new assistant head coach and the Director of Basketball Operations. Bell joined the school from the University of Nevada, Reno  while Bonner joined the school from conference rival Northern Colorado University.

They finished the season 2–27, 1–19 in Big Sky play to finish in last place. They failed to qualify for the Big Sky Conference tournament.

Roster

Schedule

|-
!colspan=9 style="background:#FF0000; color:#FFFFFF;"| Exhibition

|-
!colspan=9 style="background:#FF0000; color:#FFFFFF;"| Regular season

References

Southern Utah Thunderbirds men's basketball seasons
Southern Utah
2013 in sports in Utah
2014 in sports in Utah